Santeri Immonen (born 29 July 1972) is a Finnish former professional ice hockey defenceman and current assistant coach of SaiPa of the Liiga.

Playing career
Immonen played in the SM-liiga for Jokerit, Ässät and KalPa, playing 237 regular seasons in total between 1994 and 2000. He also played in the British Ice Hockey Superleague for the Newcastle Jesters, the Swedish HockeyAllsvenskan for IK Nyköpings and the French Ligue Magnus for the Pingouins de Morzine-Avoriaz and the Bisons de Neuilly-sur-Marne.

Coaching career
His coaching career began while he was still an active player – he served as player-coach in his final two seasons with Morzine-Avoriaz, 2009–10 and 2010–11, before ending his playing career and remaining the team's head coach through the 2011–12 season. From Morzine-Avoriaz, he moved on to the Gothiques d'Amiens, serving as assistant coach through the 2013–14 season.

Immonen returned to his native Finland in 2014, taking over as head coach for Forssan Palloseura (FPS) of the third-tier Suomi-sarja. In 2016, he accepted an assistant coaching position with the Espoo Blues' under-20 junior team of the U20 SM-sarja and, in 2017, he became head coach of Jokerit's under-20 team, also of the U20 SM-sarja.

In 2018, Immonen was appointed head coach of the Mestis team Rovaniemen Kiekko (RoKi).

References

External links
 

1972 births
Living people
Ässät players
Bisons de Neuilly-sur-Marne players
Finnish expatriate ice hockey people in France
Finnish expatriate ice hockey players in England
Finnish expatriate ice hockey players in France
Finnish expatriate ice hockey players in Sweden
Finnish ice hockey coaches
Finnish ice hockey defencemen
Jokerit players
KalPa players
Newcastle Jesters players
Nyköpings Hockey players
SaPKo players
Ice hockey people from Helsinki